Spheres is the fourth album by Dutch death metal band Pestilence, released in 1993. It was their final album before a 14-year hiatus from 1994 to 2008. On this album, the band experimented with a more progressive sound, utilizing guitar synthesizers as well as some jazz influences.

Decibel rated it positively, appreciating the "ear-candy at every turn" and the superb basswork. However, the quality of the drums work by Marco Foddis was criticised as unsuited to the range of styles present in the album.  In the hiatus before 2008 Mameli started to criticise his own album.

Track listing

Credits 
Patrick Mameli - Guitar, synth guitar, vocals
Patrick Uterwijk - Guitar, synth guitar
Jeroen Paul Thesseling - Bass
Marco Foddis - Drums

References

Pestilence (band) albums
1993 albums
Albums with cover art by Dan Seagrave
Roadrunner Records albums